The 1978 United States Senate election in Michigan was held on November 7, 1978. Incumbent Republican U.S. Senator Robert P. Griffin ran for re-election to a third term, but was defeated by the Democratic candidate, Detroit City Council President Carl Levin.

Republican primary

Candidates
 Robert P. Griffin, incumbent U.S. Senator since 1967
 L. Brooks Patterson, anti-busing activist

Results

Democratic primary

Candidates
 Anthony Derezinski, State Senator from Ann Arbor
 Carl Levin, President of the Detroit City Council
 John Otterbacher, State Senator from Grand Rapids
 Phil Power, newspaper publisher
Paul Rosenbaum, State Representative from Battle Creek
 Richard Vander Veen, former U.S. Representative from Grand Rapids

Results

Results

See also 
 1978 United States Senate elections

References 

Michigan
1978
1978 Michigan elections